Dmitry Medvedev's First Cabinet (May 2012 – May 2018) was a cabinet of the government of the Russian Federation following the 2012 Russian presidential election that resulted in the election of Vladimir Putin as the fourth President of Russia.

On 8 May 2012, The State Duma, the lower house of the bicameral Russian Parliament, voted in favor of the appointment of former President Dmitry Medvedev as the head of government, and for the first time in the past 12 years, Prime Minister candidate has not received a constitutional majority. PM Medvedev promised to update 80% of the cabinet, but he would not change its structure.

On 8 May 2013, Medvedev's first deputy Vladislav Surkov was relieved of duty after Putin reprimanded the government for failing to carry out all his presidential decrees from the previous year.

The government was dissolved on 7 May 2018, following Putin's inauguration for his 4th term as president, but continued to work as Caretaker Cabinet until the formation of the new Cabinet.

Government mechanism

Structural and personnel changes
The government was formed on 21 May 2012, shortly after the Prime Minister returned from his visit to the G8 Summit at Camp David.

Under Medvedev, only six out of 22 ministers remained in their previous positions: Anatoly Serdyukov kept his position of the Minister of Defense; Sergei Lavrov kept his position as Minister for Foreign Affairs (and became the longest-serving minister); Anton Siluanov kept his position as Minister of Finance; Vitaly Mutko kept his position as Minister of Sport, and Aleksandr Konovalov kept his position as Minister of Justice, while Vladimir Puchkov was appointed as new Minister for Emergency Situations and Vladimir Kolokoltsev became Minister for Internal Affairs, responsible for the Russian police reform.

The first structural change was the split of the Ministry of Health and Welfare Affairs into two separate Ministries – the Ministry of Health and the Ministry of Labour and Social Affairs. A new federal ministry was also formed: the Ministry for Development of Russian Far East.

The Federal Service for Supervision over Health and Social development affairs Under the Ministry for Health was renamed the Federal Service for Supervision over the Health Sphere.

The Ministry for Sports, Tourism and Youth policy was renamed the Ministry of Sports, while the tourism functions were transferred to the Culture Ministry, and the Youth Policy functions were moved to the Ministry for Education.

The Federal Service for Intellectual Property become part of the Ministry for Economic Development.

In June 2012, Medvedev signed a governmental resolution to subordinate the Federal Service for Fisheries to the Ministry of Agriculture.

On 22 April 2015, during a governmental session, Putin proposed Agriculture Minister Nikolai Fyodorov a job as Presidential Aid for Agricultural Affairs. He was replaced by former Governor of Krasnodar Krai, Aleksandr Tkachyov.

New federal bodies and dissolution of some organs
According to the Presidential Decree "On the Federal Bodies of the Executive Authority", new governmental offices were formed:
 The Governmental Commission for coordination of the Open Government Activities, headed by Minister Mikhail Abyzov.
 The Ministry for Development of Russian Far East was formed to implement of economic and social development policies in the Russian Far East.
 The Federal Agency for Construction, Housing and Public Utilities under the Regional Development Ministry of Russia

Medvedev announced on 28 May 2012 that he will manage a weekly session with his Deputies every Monday, while the Session of the Government and the Presidium of the Government will be every Wednesday.
 On 1 November 2013, the Federal Agency for Construction and Housing was re-established as Federal Ministry for Construction and Housing, and Mikhail Men, previous Governor of Ivanovo Oblast, was appointed as minister.
 On 31 March 2014, a new ministry was formed, the Ministry for Crimean Affairs. Oleg Savelyev was appointed as the minister of Crimea.

On 8 September 2014, Medvedev decided to abolish the Ministry of Regional Development following the creation of the Ministry for Crimean Affairs, Ministry for North Caucasus Affairs and the Ministry for Development of Russian Far East, which perform the same functions. The functions of the abolished Ministry of Regional Development were distributed between the Ministry of Economic Development, the Ministry of Construction and Housing and Communal Services, the Ministry of Culture of the Russian Federation, the Ministry of Finance and the Ministry of Justice. In addition, Putin signed a decree dissolving the Federal Service for Defence Contracts and the Rosoboronpostavka, Federal Agency for the supply of arms, military and special equipment and supplies, both were under the supervision of the Ministry of Defense.

Overview
Among other objectives, Medvedev's cabinet was tasked with overcoming the lowest growth of the economy since the 2008 Russian financial crisis. To do so, Medvedev offered specific measures including a strict control over tariff rises in coming years, the possible canceling of import duties on scientific equipment, regional tax holidays and a series of new measures implemented through the Central Bank to facilitate long-term investment. He also urged large Russian companies, including gas giant Gazprom, oil titan Rosneft and aluminum producer Rusal, to create their own universities.

Controversies and reception

In September, Putin openly criticized some Cabinet ministers for failing to fulfill his post-inauguration decrees in what resulted in Regional Development Minister Oleg Govorun resigning.

In 2013 Minister of Education Dmitry Livanov came under heavy criticism and members of the State Duma demanded his resignation. In April 2013 in his first State Duma report speech about the work of the government in the past year, Medvedev began his report just minutes after a video was leaked showing Putin scolding senior government officials for their poor performance during a closed-door meeting that he chaired in the Republic of Kalmykia.

Following the 2014 Crimean crisis and the Annexation of Crimea to Russia and the sanctions that were announced by the U.S, Medvedev assured that the Russian government has all necessary reserves to observe the social obligations. He said that "Despite the complicated situation and the situation in the industry, we shall try to stimulate further growth of industries, their modernization, and we shall also pay attention to investments in agriculture".

Olga Vasilieva was appointed Minister of Science and Education in August 2016, following Livanov's resignation.

On 14 November 2016, the Investigative Committee of Russia announced that Minister of Economic Development Aleksei Ulyukayev had been detained due to allegations that he received a $2 million bribe for an assessment that led to the Kremlin-controlled oil company Rosneft's acquisition of a 50.08% stake in Bashneft. This followed a string operation after months of surveillance. On the same day, Putin dismissed him from his ministerial position.

Cabinet members

References

External links
 Official Website 

Medvedev 1
2012 establishments in Russia
Dmitry Medvedev
Medvedev
Medvedev